Rafael García Doblas (born 27 September 1993) is a German-Spanish professional footballer who plays as a midfielder for Kickers Offenbach.

Career
On 26 July 2020, Garcia joined SV Waldhof Mannheim. He agreed the termination of his contract on 30 August 2021.

Honours
Rot-Weiß Oberhausen
 Lower Rhine Cup: 2017–18

Chemnitzer FC
 Saxony Cup: 2018–19

Notes

References

External links
 
 
 

1993 births
Living people
Sportspeople from Aachen
Footballers from North Rhine-Westphalia
German footballers
Spanish footballers
German people of Spanish descent
Association football midfielders
Alemannia Aachen players
Fortuna Düsseldorf II players
Rot-Weiß Oberhausen players
Chemnitzer FC players
SV Waldhof Mannheim players
Kickers Offenbach players
3. Liga players
Regionalliga players